Frederick Beasley Alexander (August 14, 1880 – March 3, 1969) was an American tennis player in the early 20th century. He won the singles title at the 1908 Australasian Championships and six double titles at Grand Slam events.

Career
In 1908, Alexander became the first foreigner to win the singles title at the Australasian/Australian Championships, the amateur precursor to the Australian Open. He then teamed with Alfred Dunlop, the man he defeated in the final, to win the doubles.

Alexander attended Princeton University and won the Intercollegiate doubles championship in 1900 and the singles in 1901. Between 1904 and 1918, he was a U.S. top 10 player six times. He was a finalist in doubles at the U.S. Championships, precursor to the US Open, seven straight times beginning in 1905. He and partner Harold Hackett won the U.S. doubles each year from 1907 to 1910. At age 37, Alexander won again in 1917, partnering with Harold Throckmorton. In the singles, Alexander reached the all comers final in 1908, beating William Clothier, then losing to Beals Wright in straight sets.

He competed in the U.S. Davis Cup team in 1908, which lost the final against Australia at the Albert Ground. Alexander lost both his singles matches against Norman Brookes and Anthony Wilding as well as the doubles match against these two with his partner Beals Wright.

In 1915, he wrote How to Play Lawn Tennis, part of the Spalding's athletic library series.

Alexander was inducted into the International Tennis Hall of Fame in 1961.

U.S. Indoor Championships
Men's Doubles champion: 1906, 1907, 1908, 1911, 1912, 1917

Grand Slam finals

Singles (1 title)

Doubles (6 titles, 5 runner-ups)

References

External links
 
 
 
 

1880 births
1969 deaths
19th-century American people
19th-century male tennis players
American male tennis players
Australasian Championships (tennis) champions
Grand Slam (tennis) champions in men's doubles
Grand Slam (tennis) champions in men's singles
International Tennis Hall of Fame inductees
People from Sea Bright, New Jersey
Princeton Tigers men's tennis players
Sportspeople from Monmouth County, New Jersey
Tennis people from New Jersey
United States National champions (tennis)